Harbour League were a franchise in the now defunct Bartercard Cup rugby league competition in New Zealand. They represented Aucklands North Shore City. They were formed in 2006 to take over from the Hibiscus Coast Raiders and the North Harbour Tigers due to the New Zealand Rugby League wishing to reduce the number of Auckland teams in favour of more regional sides.

Notable players
New Zealand Warriors associated with the club included: Louis Anderson and Tony Martin while other squad members included Jeremiah Pai, Kevin Locke and Kimi Uasi.

2006 season

In 2006 Harbour League finished sixth on the table, missing out on a finals berth by one point. They were the only Auckland club not to make the finals.

2007 Results

The 2007 Bartercard Cup kicked off on April 14 and Harbour finished the regular season in second place, only one win behind the Auckland Lions. They were defeated 28–4 in the Grand Final by the Auckland Lions who claimed their second successive title.

Auckland rugby league clubs
Defunct rugby league teams in New Zealand
Rugby clubs established in 2006
2006 establishments in New Zealand
2008 disestablishments in New Zealand